Psychopathic Rydas was an American hip hop group based in Detroit, Michigan. Formed in 1999 as a side project of Insane Clown Posse and Twiztid, the group consisted of Psychopathic Records-associated rappers performing under alternate stage names in the style of gangsta rap.<ref name="Valdivia">{{cite web |url=https://www.allmusic.com/album/r475824/review |title=Review of Psychopathic Rydas Dumpin |access-date=2008-06-28 |last=Valdivia |first=Victor W. |publisher=Allmusic |archive-date=2023-03-05 |archive-url=https://web.archive.org/web/20230305070748/https://www.allmusic.com/album/psychopathic-rydas-dumpin-mw0000609172 |url-status=live }}</ref> Their best known lineup consisted of Violent J, Shaggy 2 Dope, Jamie Madrox, Monoxide Child and Blaze Ya Dead Homie.

 History 

Psychopathic Rydas was created as a retaliation to the critics saying Psychopathic Records artists were "wannabe rappers". The supergroup was also utilized as a showcase for the label's roster which was expanding for the first time since its inception. The group first consisted of Violent J (Bullet) and Shaggy 2 Dope (Full Clip) of Insane Clown Posse, who had released five albums prior; Jamie Madrox (Lil' Shank) and Monoxide (Foe Foe) of Twiztid, who had released two versions of their debut album prior; Myzery (Twin Gatz) who had released a debut EP prior; and Blaze Ya Dead Homie (Cell Block) who was in the process of releasing his debut EP.

In the liner notes of Insane Clown Posse's album The Amazing Jeckel Brothers fans could find out how to send proof of purchase to Psychopathic Records to get a full-length album titled Dumpin', by a "gangsta rap spoof" group called Psychopathic Rydas. The album was released on the imprint Joe & Joey Records. From that point on, Rydas albums could not be officially released elsewhere due to the use of unlicensed samples and beats.

Over the next two years, there were plans for the original six members to release solo albums as their respective persona. The Pendulum #7 (which were mini releases related to Insane Clown Posse's comic book series) featured two solo songs by Violent J (Bullet) and one solo song by Shaggy 2 Dope (Full Clip). A solo song by Jamie Madrox (Lil' Shank) was leaked online, and later included on a limited edition boxset by Twiztid in 2019. A second song by Jamie Madrox (Lil' Shank) was eventually released in 2020 on Twiztid's mixtape For the Fam, Vol. 3. Solo songs by Blaze Ya Dead Homie (Cell Block), Monoxide Child (Foe Foe), and Myzery (Twin Gatz) from the same era never surfaced.

After the release of Dumpin''', Myzery (Twin Gatz) left the group and Psychopathic Records in general. The remaining five members released the album Ryden Dirtay at the 2001 Gathering of the Juggalos, just days before the other collaboration album Tales from the Lotus Pod by Dark Lotus came out. Ryden Dirtay is the only Rydas album to appear on the Billboard Independent Albums chart, at #46. Wanting to involve more artists, Rydas added two new members in 2004, being Anybody Killa (Sawed Off) and Esham (Converse). As a sampler, the Limited Edition EP was released. Three out of the four songs would be exclusive to this release. At the 2004 Gathering of the Juggalos, Check Your Shit in Bitch! was released.

Esham (Converse) and Anybody Killa (Sawed Off) left Psychopathic Records in 2005 and 2006 respectively. Blaze Ya Dead Homie (Cell Block), Violent J (Bullet), Shaggy 2 Dope (Full Clip), Jamie Madrox (Lil' Shank), and Monoxide Child (Foe Foe) were the remaining members of the group yet again, similar to 2001; however, in 2007, they added Boondox (Yung Dirt) to the group. This lineup released the album Duk Da Fuk Down that same year.

It would be four years until another Rydas collaboration happened. In 2011, Anybody Killa (Sawed Off) returned to the group. The seven members released the albums Backdoor Ryda EP and EatShitNDie. This would mark the final releases as a group. In late 2012, Twiztid (Lil' Shank and Foe Foe) and Blaze Ya Dead Homie (Cell Block) would leave Psychopathic Records to eventually form their own label, Majik Ninja Entertainment. Boondox (Yung Dirt) would leave Psychopathic Records in the following years as well. Starting in 2012, the four rappers would still appear at the annual Gathering of the Juggalos, and perform as Psychopathic Rydas as well; however, 2015 would feature the final Rydas performance. 2016 marked the artists' final appearance at the annual event, although the Rydas did not perform at that year's Gathering of the Juggalos.

Insane Clown Posse (Bullet and Full Clip) stated in various interviews that a revival of the Rydas was a possibility, but nothing concrete was ever officially announced; thus, the supergroup became inactive. In 2019, Twiztid (Lil' Shank and Foe Foe), Blaze Ya Dead Homie (Cell Block), and Boondox (Yung Dirt) created a spin-off group named The Rydas on their own label, adding in other artists as well. They released their self-titled album under Majik Ninja Entertainment on January 9, 2020. In addition, Myzery (Twin Gatz) and Anybody Killa (Sawed Off) have also released solo albums under their Psychopathic Rydas pseudonyms; however, the releases were not affiliated with Psychopathic Records or Joe & Joey Records.

 Music and Style 

Psychopathic Rydas reuses the beats of popular rappers within the genre without paying to license the original songs or requesting permission from copyright owners to use the music, effectively making their albums bootlegs and resulting in the releases becoming difficult to find in some markets. Psychopathic Rydas' debut album, Dumpin, was originally given away for correctly answering a series of trivia questions printed in the liner notes of Insane Clown Posse's album, The Amazing Jeckel Brothers.

 Discography Dumpin' (1999)The Pendulum #7 EP (2001)Ryden Dirtay (2001)Limited Edition EP (2004)Check Your Shit in Bitch! (2004)Duk Da Fuk Down (2007)Backdoor Ryda EP (2011)EatShitNDie'' (2011)

Members 
 Violent J as Bullet (1999–2015)
 Shaggy 2 Dope as Full Clip (1999–2015)
 Jamie Madrox as Lil' Shank (1999–2015)
 Monoxide Child as Foe Foe (1999–2015)
 Blaze Ya Dead Homie as Cell Block (1999–2015)
 Myzery as Twin Gatz (1999–2000)
 Anybody Killa as Sawed Off (2002–2006; 2008–2015)
 Esham as Converse (2002–2005)
 Boondox as Yung Dirt (2007–2012; 2013–2015)

References 

Bands with fictional stage personas
Detroit hip hop groups
Musical groups established in 1999
Hip hop supergroups
Underground hip hop groups
Psychopathic Records
Hip hop collectives
Gangsta rap groups
1999 establishments in Michigan